This article is a list of race tracks in Norway for auto racing and other types of motorsport, for example within road racing, kart racing, folkrace, rallycross, crosskart, hillclimbing, drag racing, off-road, motocross, supercross, supermoto and enduro.

As of 2020 there are four race tracks in Norway with a FIA grade 3 approval, and which therefore can host category 2 races:
 Arctic Circle Raceway in Nordland
 Motorcenter Norway in Rogaland
 Rudskogen in Viken
 Vålerbanen in Innlandet

Most car racing tracks are operated by clubs associated to Norges Bilsportforbund, either via Norsk Motor Klubb or Kongelig Norsk Automobilklub. Many other forms of racing are operated by clubs associated with Norges Motorsportforbund.

List of tracks

See also 
 Norwegian Grand Prix

References

External links 
 NBF list of race tracks in Norway
 KNA list of race tracks in Norway
 NAF list of race tracks in Norway
 Map of off-road tracks in Norway
 Map of rallycross and folkrace tracks in Norway

Motorsport venues in Norway
Lists of motorsport venues